Cryptophagus valens is a species of silken fungus beetle in the family Cryptophagidae. It is found in North America.

Subspecies
These two subspecies belong to the species Cryptophagus valens:
 Cryptophagus valens cyaneoisignata Casey
 Cryptophagus valens valens

References

Further reading

 
 

Cryptophagidae
Articles created by Qbugbot
Beetles described in 1900